RSTP :
Rstp, the abbreviation for the orchid genus Restrepia
 Rapid Spanning Tree Protocol, a computer network protocol